Rebeca Lissette Quinteros Ortíz (born 28 August 1997) is a Salvadoran swimmer. She competed in the women's 400 metre freestyle event at the 2016 Summer Olympics. Her time was just under five minutes in an event that was won by Katie Ledecky. In 2014, she represented El Salvador at the 2014 Summer Youth Olympics held in Nanjing, China.

References

External links
 

1997 births
Living people
Salvadoran female swimmers
Olympic swimmers of El Salvador
Swimmers at the 2016 Summer Olympics
Place of birth missing (living people)
Swimmers at the 2014 Summer Youth Olympics
Swimmers at the 2015 Pan American Games
Pan American Games competitors for El Salvador
Salvadoran female freestyle swimmers
21st-century Salvadoran women